Chrysolepis is a small genus of plants in the family Fagaceae, endemic to the western United States. Its two species have the common name chinquapin. The genus occurs from western Washington south to the Transverse Ranges in Southern California, and east into Nevada.

Description
Chrysolepis are evergreen trees and shrubs with simple, entire (untoothed) leaves with a dense layer of golden scales on the underside and a thinner layer on the upper side; the leaves persist for 3–4 years before falling.

The fruit is a densely spiny cupule containing 1–3 sweet, edible nuts, eaten by the indigenous peoples. The fruit also provides food for chipmunks and squirrels.

Chrysolepis is related to the subtropical southeast Asian genus Castanopsis (in which it was formerly included), but differs in the nuts being triangular and fully enclosed in a sectioned cupule, and in having bisexual catkins. Chrysolepis also differs from another allied genus Castanea (chestnuts), in nuts that take 14–16 months to mature (3–5 months in Castanea), evergreen leaves and the shoots having a terminal bud.

Species
There are two species of  Chrysolepis — Chrysolepis chrysophylla and Chrysolepis sempervirens — which like many species in the related genera of Castanopsis and Castanea are called chinquapin, also spelled "chinkapin".

References

External links

Jepson Manual Treatment: Genus Chrysolepis
 Jepson Manual Treatment - Chrysolepis chrysophylla
 Jepson Manual Treatment - Chrysolepis sempervirens 
USDA Plants Profile: Chrysolepis
Flora of North America - Chrysolepis

Fagaceae
Edible nuts and seeds
Trees of the Southwestern United States
Trees of the Northwestern United States
Flora of the Sierra Nevada (United States)
Flora of California
~
Bird food plants
Plants used in Native American cuisine
Fagales genera